The Confederation of German Employers' Associations or BDA (German: Bundesvereinigung der Deutschen Arbeitgeberverbände) is the umbrella organization for German employers' associations. It represents interest groups in the areas of industry, the tertiary sector, banking, commerce, transport, trade and agriculture. 

In 1977, Ex SS officer and head of BDA, Hanns Martin Schleyer, was murdered by the Red Army Faction, a far-left German militant group.

The seat of the BDA is in Berlin (until 1999: Cologne).

References

External links 
 English website of the Confederation of German Employers' Associations

Labor in Germany
Employers' organizations
Organisations based in Berlin
Advocacy groups in Germany
Lobbying in Germany